The Royal Irish Regiment (27th (Inniskilling), 83rd, 87th and The Ulster Defence Regiment) (R IRISH) is an infantry regiment of the British Army. The regiment was founded in 1992 through the amalgamation of the Royal Irish Rangers and the Ulster Defence Regiment. Their oldest predecessor, the 27th Regiment of Foot, was first raised in June 1689 to fight in the Williamite War in Ireland. Other notable regiments in their lineage include the Royal Inniskilling Fusiliers, Royal Irish Rifles and the Royal Irish Fusiliers (Princess Victoria's).

The motto of the regiment is Faugh A Ballagh (Modern Irish: Fág an Bealach), derived from the Irish Gaelic phrase for "Clear the Way". This originates from the Peninsular War when Ensign Edward Keogh of the 87th Regiment of Foot let out the cry while capturing a French Imperial Eagle at the Battle of Barrosa. The Regimental Headquarters of the Royal Irish Regiment has been Palace Barracks in County Down, Northern Ireland since moving there in 2008.

History
With an antecedence reaching back to 1688, the regiment was formed in 1992. The creation followed the Options for Change proposals which recommended the amalgamation of the Royal Irish Rangers and the Ulster Defence Regiment (UDR). Most of the membership of the new regiment came from the UDR. This produced an overwhelmingly Ulster Protestant regiment with eleven battalions:

Regular Army – General Service
1st Battalion, Royal Irish Regiment
2nd Battalion, Royal Irish Regiment
Territorial Army
4th Battalion, Royal Irish Rangers
5th Battalion, Royal Irish Rangers
Regular Army – Northern Ireland Resident Battalions (Home Service)
3rd (County Down) Battalion, Royal Irish Regiment
4th (County Fermanagh and County Tyrone) Battalion, Royal Irish Regiment
5th (County Londonderry) Battalion, Royal Irish Regiment
6th (County Armagh) Battalion, Royal Irish Regiment (former 2nd/11th Battalion UDR)
7th (City of Belfast) Battalion, Royal Irish Regiment
8th (County Tyrone) Battalion, Royal Irish Regiment
9th (County Antrim) Battalion, Royal Irish Regiment

The Home Service battalions, permanently based in Northern Ireland, filled the role formerly occupied by the UDR, assisting the Royal Ulster Constabulary (with a focus on combating militant Irish republicanism), in Northern Ireland during Operation Banner. The 1st and 2nd Battalions could serve worldwide as general service battalions.

Because of its size, the regiment was removed from the King's Division and existed within its own division of infantry. In August 1993, the two regular battalions were amalgamated as the 1st battalion.

In 2000 in Sierra Leone, whilst deployed to train government troops, eleven Royal Irish soldiers and their local army liaison officer were captured by the West Side Boys insurgents. Five hostages were later released and the remaining six were freed by the Special Air Service and The Parachute Regiment during Operation Barras: with the West Side Boys suffering severe casualties in the action.

The 1st Battalion deployed to Iraq at the beginning of Operation Telic in March 2003, where they carried out operations in the south of the country. Its (now-retired) commanding officer, Lieutenant Colonel Tim Collins was appointed an Officer of the Order of the British Empire for distinguished service.

The number of Home Service battalions were reduced to three by April 2003:

2nd Battalion – amalgamation of 7th and 9th Battalions
3rd Battalion – amalgamation of 3rd and 8th Battalions
4th Battalion – amalgamation of 4th and 5th Battalions

In 2005, the Provisional Irish Republican Army announced an end to its armed campaign. In response the British government announced the end of Operation Banner, and with it the disbandment of the Home Service battalions. A redundancy package was announced in March 2006. The Home Service battalions were awarded the Conspicuous Gallantry Cross (CGC) by the Queen in Belfast on 6 October 2006. The home service battalions were declared non-operational in October 2006, and disbanded in July 2007. At the same time, the Royal Irish Rangers, then serving as the TA battalion, was renamed as 2nd Battalion, Royal Irish Regiment.

The 1st Battalion returned from six months in Iraq on Op TELIC VI/VII in May 2006 having served in the Shaibah Logistics Base near Basra. Although the majority of the battalion was deployed around the MND(SE) area a single company was deployed to Baghdad.

Three platoons of the 1st Battalion (Barrosa, Somme and Ranger Platoons) deployed to Afghanistan in 2006, as part of 16 Air Assault Brigade and supported 3rd Parachute Regiment, the latter forming 9 Platoon, C Coy, 3 PARA. They were involved in some of the heaviest fighting during HERRICK IV. Lance Corporal Paul Muirhead, Lance Corporal Luke McCulloch and Fijian Ranger Anare Draiva were killed by the Taliban during HERRICK IV.

In summer 2007 the Regimental Headquarters moved from St Patrick's Barracks, Ballymena to Palace Barracks, Belfast.

Both battalions deployed to Afghanistan in 2008, as part of 16 Air Assault Brigade. The 1st battalion provided Operational Mentoring and Liaison Teams (OMLTs) to assist in training the Afghan National Army (ANA) and Afghan National Police (ANP), and the 2nd battalion were the first Territorial Army company strength grouping to provide OMLT training from NATO forces. They were also the first TA Company to fully man Forward Operating Bases (FOBs) within the green zone. One company of the 1st Battalion, attached to 2 PARA, named Ranger Company, undertook offensive operations in the Sangin area of Helmand Province. The 1st Battalion lost Ranger Justin Cupples to an improvised explosive device (IED) during HERRICK VIII.

Both battalions again deployed with 16 Air Assault Brigade to Afghanistan on HERRICK XIII from September 2010. Based in the southern part of Helmand, they lost Lance Corporal Stephen McKee, Ranger Aaron McCormick and Ranger David Dalzell during HERRICK XIII.

Under the Defence in a Competitive Age programme and subsequent Future Soldier, the 1st Battalion will transfer to the 16 Air Assault Brigade.

Current structure
The 1st Battalion (1 R IRISH) is a Light Recce Strike Infantry unit and comes under the 16 Air Assault Brigade Combat Team. Its personnel are based at Clive Barracks in Tern Hill.

The 2nd Battalion (2 R IRISH) is an Army Reserve infantry unit and comes under the 19th Brigade. It is headquartered at Thiepval Barracks in Lisburn.

Operational honours

Iraq
Corporal Trevor Raywood Coult, Military Cross
Lieutenant Richard Gordon Deane, Military Cross.

Afghanistan
 Lieutenant Colonel Colin Richard James Weir, MBE, Distinguished Service Order
 Lance Corporal Ratu Apenisa Qalitakivuna, Military Cross
 Acting Sergeant Alwyn John Stevens, Conspicuous Gallantry Cross
 Corporal Robert William Kerr McClurg, Conspicuous Gallantry Cross
 Lance Corporal Jone Bruce Toge, Conspicuous Gallantry Cross
 Captain Douglas Ricardo Beattie, Military Cross
 Captain David Bradley Rainey, Military Cross
 Lieutenant Paul David McFarland, Military Cross
 Sergeant Stephen McConnell, Military Cross
 Ranger Alan William Owens, Military Cross

Elizabeth Cross and Memorial Scrolls
Up to May 2010, 32 Elizabeth Cross and Memorial Scrolls have been issued to the families of Royal Irish personnel.

Traditions
In memory of a 2006 battle in the Afghan town of Musa Qala, a new Regimental March, composed by Chris Attrill and commissioned by Larne Borough Council, was given to the regiment on Saturday 1 November 2008 in Larne, County Antrim, during an event in which the regiment was also presented with the 'Freedom of the Borough'. This gives the regiment the right to march through the town with "flags flying, bands playing and bayonets fixed". The March was named Musa Qala.

The uniform combines elements of the uniform of the Royal Irish Rangers with the harp-and-crown cap badge of the Ulster Defence Regiment.

Sticks made of Blackthorn are carried by commissioned officers of the Royal Irish Regiment.

Colonel-in-Chief
The Duke of York, GCVO, ADC (1992–2022), who presented the regiment's colours to St Patrick's Church of Ireland Cathedral in Armagh on  16 June 2001: there is a plaque commemorating this event in the south aisle.
Vacant (2022–present)

Regimental Colonels
Colonels of the regiment have been:
1992–1996: Gen. Sir Charles Richard Huxtable, KCB, CBE
1996–2001: Gen. Sir Roger Neil Wheeler, GCB, CBE
2001–2013: Lt-Gen. Philip Charles Cornwallis Trousdell, KBE, CB
2013–2018: Brig. Joseph S.S. O'Sullivan
2018–Present: Major General Colin Weir DSO MBE

Order of precedence

Lineage

Alliances
 – 101st Airborne Division
 – The Princess Louise Fusiliers
 – 2nd Battalion, Irish Regiment of Canada
 – Adelaide University Regiment
  - 2nd Canterbury, and Nelson-Marlborough and West Coast Regiment
 – Andrew Mlangeni Regiment
 – Royal Gibraltar Regiment
 – 1st Battalion, Punjab Regiment
 – 9th Battalion, Frontier Force Regiment
 – HMS Bulwark

References

External links

Official site
RIR Association

 
1992 establishments in the United Kingdom
Infantry regiments of the British Army
Irish regiments of the British Army
Military units and formations established in 1992
Military units and formations of the Iraq War
Military units and formations of the United Kingdom in the War in Afghanistan (2001–2021)
Irish regiments